Badausa is a town in Uttar Pradesh, India. It comes under Chitrakoot Division, Banda District and Atarra tehsil of Uttar Pradesh.  

The PIN code of Badausa is 210202.The river Bagain passes through Badausa. It has a railway station, Allahabad Bank and Intermediate college. It also has a police station. It lies along Jhansi-Prayagraj NH35.badausa ek jama masjid hai vahan Muslim ilaka bahut achcha hai vahan ki log miljul kar rahte hain vahan Nuri masjid imam Husain masjid Imambara hai mohharam badi dhumdham se manaya jata hai memorial school vahin ka famous college hai

References

Cities and towns in Banda district, India